Rufiji may refer to:

 Rufiji Delta, a region in Tanzania
 Rufiji District, in the Pwani Region of Tanzania
 Rufiji River, in Tanzania
 Rufiji (ethnic group), of eastern Tanzania
 Rufiji language, spoken by the Rufiji people